King Island is an island in the north Sacramento-San Joaquin River Delta, twenty kilometres east of Antioch, and twenty kilometres west of Stockton. The  island is bounded on the north by White Slough, on the east by Bishop Cut, on the south by Disappointment Slough, and on the west, Honker Cut. It is in San Joaquin County, and managed by Reclamation District 2044. It appears on a 1952 United States Geological Survey map of the area.

See also
List of islands of California

References

Islands of the Sacramento–San Joaquin River Delta
Islands of Northern California
Islands of San Joaquin County, California
Islands of California